Fort Blair can refer to:
A 1774 precursor to Fort Randolph (1776), Point Pleasant, West Virginia, USA
Fort Blair, Kansas; site of the Battle of Baxter Springs